This is a list of the mammal species recorded in Hong Kong. There are 68 mammal species in Hong Kong.

The following tags are used to highlight each species' conservation status as assessed by the International Union for Conservation of Nature:

Some species were assessed using an earlier set of criteria. Species assessed using this system have the following instead of near threatened and least concern categories:

Order: Primates 

The order Primates contains humans and their closest relatives: lemurs, lorisoids, monkeys, and apes.

Suborder: Haplorhini
Infraorder: Simiiformes
Parvorder: Catarrhini
Superfamily: Cercopithecoidea
Family: Cercopithecidae (Old World monkeys)
Genus: Macaca
 Rhesus macaque, Macaca mulatta  reintroduced 
 Crab-eating macaque, Macaca fascicularis   introduced

Order: Rodentia (mice, squirrel, etc) 

The order Rodentia is a large group of mammals. They have two incisors in the upper as well as in the lower jaw which grow continuously and must be kept worn down by gnawing.
Muridae
Subfamily: Murinae
Genus: Bandicota
Greater bandicoot rat, Bandicota bengalensis 
Chestnut spiny rat, Niviventer fulvescens 
House mouse, Mus musculus   introduced  
Brown rat, Rattus norvegicus   introduced 
Ryukyu mouse, Mus caroli 
Sikkim rat, Rattus andamanensis 
Asiatic house rat, Rattus tanezumi 
Roof rat, Rattus rattus   introduced  
Family:Sciuridae
Pallas's squirrel, Callosciurus erythraeus   introduced 
Family: Hystricidae (porcupine)
Genus: Hystrix
Malayan porcupine, Hystrix brachyura

Order: Chiroptera (bats) 

The bats' most distinguishing feature is that their forelimbs are developed as wings, making them the only mammals capable of flight. Bat species account for about 50% of all mammals.

Family: Pteropodidae
Genus: Rousettus
 Leschenault's rousette, Rousettus leschenaultia 
Genus: Cynopterus
 Greater short-nosed fruit bat, Cynopterus sphinx  (common)
Family: Emballonuridae
Genus: Taphozous
Black-bearded tomb bat,  Taphozous melanopogon 
Family: Rhinolophidae
Genus: Rhinolophus
Rufous horseshoe bat, Rhinolophus rouxi  (common)
Intermediate horseshoe bat, Rhinolophus affinus  (common)
Least horseshoe bat, Rhinolophus pusillus  (common)
Family: Hipposideridae
Genus: Hipposideros
Pomona roundleaf bat, Hipposideros pomona   (common)
Himalayan roundleaf bat, Hipposideros armiger
Family: Vespertilionidae
Genus: Myotis
Large myotis, Myotis chinensis 
Rickett's big-footed bat, Myotis ricketti 
 Myotis fimbriatus
Horsfield's bat, Myotis horsfieldii  (rare in the region)
Daubenton's bat, Myotis daubentonii  rare)
Genus: Pipistrellus
Japanese pipistrelle, Pipistrellus abramus   (abundant
Chinese pipistrelle, Pipistrellus pulveratus  (rare)
Genus: Nyctalus
Common noctule, Nyctalus noctula 
Genus: Tylonycteris
Lesser bamboo bat, Tylonycteris pachypus  (rare in the region)
Greater bamboo bat, Tylonycteris robustula 
Genus: Scotophilus
Lesser yellow bat, Scotophilus kuhlii  (rare)
Genus: Miniopterus
Western bent-winged bat, Miniopterus magnater  (common)
Common bent-wing bat, Miniopterus schreibersii  (rare)
Small bent-winged bat, Miniopterus pusillus 
Family:Molossidae
Genus: Chaerephon
Wrinkle-lipped free-tailed bat, Chaerephon plicata

Order: Pholidota (pangolins) 

The order Pholidota comprises the eight species of pangolin. Pangolins are anteaters and have the powerful claws, elongated snout and long tongue seen in the other unrelated anteater species.

Family: Manidae
Genus: Manis
Chinese pangolin, Manis pentadactyla

Order: Cetacea (whales) 

The order Cetacea includes whales, dolphins and porpoises. They are the mammals most fully adapted to aquatic life with a spindle-shaped nearly hairless body, protected by a thick layer of blubber, and forelimbs and tail modified to provide propulsion underwater.

Suborder: Mysticeti
Family: Balaenidae
Genus: Eubalaena
 North Pacific right whale, Eubalaena japonica  
Family: Balaenopteridae
Subfamily: Megapterinae
Genus: Megaptera
 Humpback whale, Megaptera novaeangliae  (very rare today)
Subfamily: Balaenopterinae
Genus: Balaenoptera
 Common minke whale, Balaenoptera acutorostrata  (unconfirmed)
 Omura's whale, Balaenoptera brydei  (possible)
 Bryde's whale, Balaenoptera brydei 
 Fin whale, Balaenoptera physalus  (unconfirmed)
Suborder: Odontoceti
Superfamily: Platanistoidea
Genus: Physeter
Family: Physeteridae
 Sperm whale, Physeter macrocephalus 
Family: Kogiidae
Genus: Kogia
 Pygmy sperm whale, Kogia breviceps 
Family: Delphinidae (marine dolphins)
Family: Phocoenidae
Genus: Neophocaena
 Indo-Pacific finless porpoise, Neophocaena phocaenoides 
Genus: Sousa
Chinese white dolphin, Sousa chinensis  (Locally )
Genus: Tursiops
 Indo-Pacific bottlenose dolphin, Tursiops aduncus 
 Common bottlenose dolphin, Tursiops truncatus 
Genus: Delphinus
 Long-beaked common dolphin, Delphinus capensis 
Genus: Stenella
 Pantropical spotted dolphin, Stenella attenuata 
 Spinner dolphin, Stenella longirostris 
 Striped dolphin, Stenella coeruleoalba 
Genus: Steno
 Rough-toothed dolphin, Steno bredanensis 
Genus: Lagenodelphis
 Fraser's dolphin, Lagenodelphis hosei 
Genus: Grampus
 Risso's dolphin, Grampus griseus 
Genus: Pseudorca
 False killer whale, Pseudorca crassidens

Order: Artiodactyla (even-toed ungulates) 

The order Artiodactyla in Hong Kong are mainly herbivore which feed only on plant material, except wild boar.
Family: Bovidae
Genus: Bubalus
Water buffalo, Bubalus bubalis introduced
Family: Bovidae
Genus: Bos
Zebu, Bos indicus introduced
Family: Cervidae
Genus: Muntiacus
 Reeves's muntjac, Muntiacus reevesi 
Family: Suidae
Genus: Sus
Wild boar, Sus scrofa

Order: Carnivora (carnivorans) 

There are over 260 species of carnivorans, the majority of which eat meat as their primary dietary item. They have a characteristic skull shape and dentition.

Suborder: Feliformia
Family: Felidae (cats)
Subfamily: Felinae
Genus: Prionailurus
 Leopard cat, Prionailurus bengalensis 
Genus: Felis
 Domestic cat, Felis catus introduced
Subfamily: Pantherinae
Genus: Panthera
Tiger, Panthera tigris  extirpated
Clouded leopard, Neofelis nebulosa extirpated
Leopard, Panthera pardus  extirpated
Family: Canidae (dog, wolf etc.)
Subfamily: Caninae
Genus: Cuon
Dhole, Cuon alpinus  extirpated
Genus: Vulpes
Red fox, Vulpes vulpes  extirpated
Genus: Canis
Domestic dog, Canis familiaris introduced
Family: Viverridae (civets, etc.)
Subfamily: Viverrinae
Genus: Viverricula
Large Indian civet, Viverra zibetha  extirpated
Small Indian civet, Viverricula indica 
Masked palm civet, Paguma larvata 
Family:Herpestidae (mongoose)
Subfamily:Herpestinae
Genus: Urva
Javan mongoose, Urva javanica   
Crab-eating mongoose, Urva urva 
Suborder: Caniformia
Family: Mustelidae (mustelids)
Genus: Mustela
Yellow-bellied weasel, Mustela kathiah 
Genus: Lutra
 European otter, Lutra lutra 
Genus: Melogale
Chinese ferret badger, Melogale moschata

See also

Wildlife of China
List of chordate orders
List of mammals of China
Lists of mammals by region
List of prehistoric mammals
Mammal classification
List of mammals described in the 2000s

Notes

References
 

Hong Kong
Mammals

Hong Kong